This is a list of all the United States Supreme Court cases from volume 380 of the United States Reports:

 Udall v. Tallman, 
 Singer v. United States, 
 Crider v. Zurich Ins. Co., 
 Freedman v. Maryland, 
 United States v. Gainey, 
 Carrington v. Rash, 
 United States v. Ventresca, 
 In re Ryan,  (per curiam)
 Mason v. Midwestern Gas Transmission Co.,  (per curiam)
 City of Coronado v. San Diego Unified Port Dist.,  (per curiam)
 Drueding v. Devlin,  (per curiam)
 Maddox v. Birzgalis,  (per curiam)
 Bonanno v. Louisiana,  (per curiam)
 Blaauw v. Grand Trunk Western R. Co.,  (per curiam)
 United States v. Mississippi, 
 Louisiana v. United States, 
 United States v. Boston & Maine R. Co., 
 United States v. Seeger, 
 Department of Mental Hygiene of Cal. v. Kirchner, 
 Swain v. Alabama, 
 Hughes Tool Co. v. Trans World Airlines, Inc.,  (per curiam)
 Hughes Tool Co. v. Trans World Airlines, Inc.,  (per curiam)
 Arthur v. Colorado,  (per curiam)
 Hall v. Illinois,  (per curiam)
 Davis v. Mabry,  (per curiam)
 Stadler v. State Bd. of Equalization of Cal.,  (per curiam)
 Barnes v. Texas,  (per curiam)
 Seals v. Alabama,  (per curiam)
 Radio & Television Technicians v. Broadcast Service of Mobile, Inc.,  (per curiam)
 Reserve Life Ins. Co. v. Bowers,  (per curiam)
 Trans-Lux Distributing Corp. v. Board of Regents of Univ. of N. Y.,  (per curiam)
 Santos v. Texas,  (per curiam)
 Baker v. Alaska,  (per curiam)
 Martinez v. United States,  (per curiam)
 Harrison v. McNamara,  (per curiam)
 Genovese v. Ohio,  (per curiam)
 Marvel v. United States,  (per curiam)
 Textile Workers v. Darlington Manufacturing Company, 
 NLRB v. Brown Food Stores, 
 American Ship Building Co. v. NLRB, 
 Sansone v. United States, 
 Henry v. Collins,  (per curiam)
 O'Keeffe v. Smith, Hinchman & Grylls Associates, Inc.,  (per curiam)
 Chicago, R. I. & P. R. Co. v. United States,  (per curiam)
 FTC v. Colgate-Palmolive Co., 
 Pointer v. Texas, 
 Douglas v. Alabama, 
 Burnett v. New York Central R. Co., 
 NLRB v. Metropolitan Life Ins. Co., 
 Jenkins v. United States,  (per curiam)
 Abernathy v. Alabama,  (per curiam)
 Chicago & North Western R. Co. v. Chicago, M., St. P. & P. R. Co.,  (per curiam)
 McKinnie v. Tennessee,  (per curiam)
 U.S. A. C. Transport, Inc. v. United States,  (per curiam)
 American Oil Co. v. Neill, 
 Hanna v. Plumer, 
 Dombrowski v. Pfister, 
 American Comm. for Protection of Foreign Born v. Subversive Activities Control Bd.,  (per curiam)
 Veterans of Abraham Lincoln Brigade v. Subversive Activities Control Bd.,  (per curiam)
 Texas v. New Jersey, 
 Callender v. Florida,  (per curiam)
 Gold v. DiCarlo,  (per curiam)
 Corpora v. New York,  (per curiam)
 Cumberland Farms Northern, Inc. v. Maine Milk Comm'n,  (per curiam)
 Brown v. California, 
 Western & Southern Life Ins. Co. v. NLRB,  (per curiam)
 Metropolitan Life Ins. Co. v. NLRB,   (per curiam)
 Thomas v. Mississippi,  (per curiam)
 Metropolitan Life Ins. Co. v. NLRB,  (per curiam)
 Carolina & Northwestern R. Co. v. United States,  (per curiam)
 Murray v. United States,  (per curiam)
 Harman v. Forssenius, 
 Armstrong v. Manzo, 
 General Motors Corp. v. District of Columbia, 
 Commissioner v. Brown, 
 FTC v. Consolidated Foods Corp., 
 Griffin v. California, 
 Paragon Jewel Coal Co. v. Commissioner, 
 Railway Clerks v. Association for Benefit of Noncontract Employees, 
 Commissioner v. Estate of Noel, 
 Warren Trading Post Co. v. Arizona Tax Comm'n, 
 One 1958 Plymouth Sedan v. Pennsylvania,

External links

1965 in United States case law